Sorbus pseudovilmorinii is a variable deciduous flowering tree.

Description
Height: Ultimate height of 4 meters to 7.5 meters.
Leaves: Pinnate, with a fern-like appearance.
Flowers: White.
Fruit: Variable, often crimson in color, becoming white or white with crimson flecks as it reaches maturity, typically by October.

Etymology
Sorbus is the ancient Latin name for the fruit of the service tree, Sorbus. ‘Service’ and ‘Sorbus’ are cognates.

Pseudovilmorinii means ‘false vilmorinii’.

Range and distribution
Native to northern Vietnam, Tibet, and western China, including Yunnan province, from whence the most attractive specimens can be found.

Habitat
Grows in mountains, forest scrub, or coniferous or mixed forests.

Prefers a sunny or partially shaded site with free-draining soil. Dislikes heavy clay soils.

Cultivation
Sorbus pseudovilmorinii is the parent of several Sorbus hybrids.

References

Flora of China
Flora of Korea
Flora of Tibet
pseudovilmorinii